Miss USA 1978 was the 27th Miss USA pageant, televised live by CBS from the Gillard Municipal Auditorium in Charleston, South Carolina on April 29, 1978.

The pageant was won by Judi Andersen of Hawaii, who was crowned by outgoing titleholder Kimberly Tomes of Texas.  Andersen was the third woman from Hawaii to win the Miss USA title, and went on to place as 1st runner-up to Margaret Gardiner of South Africa at Miss Universe 1978.

Results

Placements

Special awards

Historical significance 
 Hawaii wins competition for the third time.
 Massachusetts earns the 1st runner-up position for the first time.
 Texas earns the 2nd runner-up position for the first time.
 Indiana earns the 3rd runner-up position for the first time.
 New Mexico earns the 4th runner-up position for the second time. The last time it placed this was in 1968.
 States that placed in semifinals the previous year were California, Hawaii, New Mexico, Texas and Virginia.
 California placed for the twenty-second consecutive year.
 Texas placed for the fourth consecutive year. 
 New Mexico placed for the third consecutive year. 
 Hawaii and Virginia made their second consecutive placement.
 Florida and Indiana last placed in 1975.
 Alaska last placed in 1972.
 Pennsylvania last placed in 1971.
 Massachusetts and Utah last placed in 1966.
 Oklahoma last placed in 1965.
 Georgia and Minnesota break an ongoing streak of placements since 1976.

Delegates
The Miss USA 1978 delegates were:

 Alabama - Eva Jo Stancil
 Alaska - Barbara Samuelson
 Arizona - Jacquie Crutchfield
 Arkansas - Donna Funderburk
 California - Donna Adrian
 Colorado - Linda Potestio
 Connecticut - Martha Szabo
 Delaware - Donna Lewis
 District of Columbia - Wanda Clineman
 Florida - April Shaw
 Georgia - Larinda Matthews
 Hawaii - Judi Andersen
 Idaho - Suzette Sanford
 Illinois - Suzanne Piche
 Indiana - Jayme Buecher
 Iowa - Michelle Daley
 Kansas - Diddy Bell
 Kentucky - Linda Woodruff
 Louisiana - Tauny Hanes
 Maine - Catherine Ledue
 Maryland - Rhonda Koch
 Massachusetts - Diane Pollard
 Michigan - April Patrick
 Minnesota - Janey Gohl
 Mississippi - Wanda Gatlin
 Missouri - Paula Taylor
 Montana - Susan Riplett
 Nebraska - Shari Reimers
 Nevada - Rochelle Jameson
 New Hampshire - Barbara Miller
 New Jersey - Sheryl Ann Hoehn
 New Mexico - Marlena Garland
 New York - Darlene Javits
 North Carolina - Kathryn Norman
 North Dakota - Theresa Olson
 Ohio - Sheila Anderson
 Oklahoma - Nancy Lippold
 Oregon - Julie Heater
 Pennsylvania - Sandy Dell
 Rhode Island - Sharon McGarry
 South Carolina - Kathryn Threatt
 South Dakota - Nadene Oppold
 Tennessee - Suzanna Timberlake
 Texas - Barbra Horan
 Utah - Margo Flynn
 Vermont - Nancy Wierzbicki
 Virginia - Robin Shadle
 Washington - Barbara Bogar
 West Virginia - Deborah Davis
 Wisconsin - Cynthia Paulson
 Wyoming - Kathryn Flitner

Judges
LeRoy Neiman
Barbara Peterson
Theodore Bikel
Eileen Ford

External links 
 

1978
April 1978 events in the United States
1978 beauty pageants
1978 in South Carolina